Paul Cafaro (born May 8, 1966), known professionally as Blag Dahlia, is an American singer and record producer, best known as the vocalist for punk band Dwarves.

Career

Music 
Dahlia is best known as the frontman of Dwarves, a punk rock band, which he founded while attending Highland Park High School in suburban Chicago in the mid-1980s. With the Dwarves, he has written and produced nearly a dozen studio records over a span of over 30 years. He has produced albums by Mondo Generator, Dwarves, F.Y.P, Jon Cougar Concentration Camp, Swingin' Utters, and The God Awfuls. He also released solo material as Blag Dahlia and under one of his other aliases, Earl Lee Grace. Blackgrass (1995), a 13-song LP of bluegrass songs, was released on the Sympathy for the Record Industry label using a backing band of real bluegrass musicians. He started an acoustic duo with Nick Oliveri, The Uncontrollable. He narrated the opening score on Last Day of School by Autopsy Boys. In 1999, he sang "Doing the Sponge" in the SpongeBob SquarePants episode "The Chaperone".

Films 
Two songs recorded by Dahlia were on the soundtrack to A.W. Feidler's short film The Job (1997). In 2001, Dahlia performed "Zine-O-Phobia Music" for the Ghost World soundtrack. Dahlia appears in a mock snuff film entitled Misogynist: The Movie (2003). The Dwarves song "Massacre", which Dahlia wrote, was on the soundtrack to the 2006 film Hostel. He also narrated Chris Fuller's 2007 independent film Loren Cass.

Writing 
Dahlia has authored three novels, Armed to the Teeth with Lipstick (1998), Nina (2006), and Highland Falls (2022).

Controversy 
In 2004, Dahlia was involved in an altercation with Josh Homme at a Los Angeles club, after which Homme was arrested for assault. Upon pleading no contest, Homme was ordered to remain at least 100 yards (91.44 meters) away from Dahlia and the club, was sentenced to three years' probation with community service, and was forced to enter a rehab program for 60 days.

Solo discography 
"Let's Take a Ride" / "Lord of the Road" 7" (1994), Sympathy for the Record Industry
"Doing the Sponge" (1999), SpongeBob SquarePants
Venus With Arms CD (1995), Atavistic
Blackgrass CD album (1995), Sympathy for the Record Industry – released under the name Earl Lee Grace
"Haunt Me" / "Let's Take a Ride" 7" (1996), Man's Ruin

References

External links 
Feature: The New Pop Idol: Candy Now and Blag Dahlia?!
Nothing But Hits with Blag Dahlia, column for PlugInMusic.com
Blag Dahlia's best things about 2008
Blag Dahlia interview on RocknRollDating from 2009

1966 births
American male singers
Living people
Sympathy for the Record Industry artists
20th-century American novelists
American bluegrass musicians
American punk rock musicians
American punk rock singers
Place of birth missing (living people)
21st-century American novelists
American male novelists
20th-century American male writers
21st-century American male writers
Dwarves (band) members
Atavistic Records artists